Marc Gomez (born 19 September 1954) is a French former professional road bicycle racer. Born in Rennes, he has Spanish heritage, as his parents were born in Torrelavega, Spain. He was a professional from 1982 until 1989.

Palmarès 

 1979
 1st, Bordeaux-Saintes

 1981
 1st, Bordeaux-Saintes
 3rd, National Road Championships, Amateurs

 1982
 1st, Camors
 1st, Langolen
 1st, Milan–San Remo
 Vuelta a España
 1st, Prologue
 3rd, Stage 2
 3rd, Stage 3

 1983
 1st, National Road Championships

 1984
 1st, Lanester

 1985
 1st, Overall, Postgirot Open
 1st, Stage 1
 3rd, Stage 8
 1st, Stage 3 Tour de France (team time trial)

 1986
 Vuelta a España
 1st, Stage 2
 1st, Stage 20

 1988
 1st, Bordeaux-Cauderan
 1st, Stage 4a, Vuelta a la Communidad Valenciana

External links 

French male cyclists
French Vuelta a España stage winners
1954 births
Living people
Cyclists from Rennes
French people of Spanish descent
21st-century French people
20th-century French people